In geotechnical engineering, soil structure describes the arrangement of the solid parts of the soil and of the pore space located between them. It is determined by how individual soil granules clump, bind together, and aggregate, resulting in the arrangement of soil pores between them. Soil has a major influence on water and air movement, biological activity, root growth and seedling emergence. There are several different types of soil structure. It is inherently a dynamic and complex system that is affected by different factors.

Overview 
Soil structure describes the arrangement of the solid parts of the soil and of the pore spaces located between them (Marshall & Holmes, 1979). Aggregation is the result of the interaction of soil particles through rearrangement, flocculation and cementation. It is enhanced by: the precipitation of oxides, hydroxides, carbonates and silicates; the products of biological activity (such as biofilms, fungal hyphae and glycoproteins); ionic bridging between negatively charged particles (both clay minerals and organic compounds) by multivalent cations; and interactions between organic compounds (hydrogen bonding and hydrophobic bonding).

The quality of soil structure will decline under most forms of cultivation—the associated mechanical mixing of the soil compacts and shears aggregates and fills pore spaces; it also exposes organic matter to a greater rate of decay and oxidation. A further consequence of continued cultivation and traffic is the development of compacted, impermeable layers or 'pans' within the profile.

The decline of soil structure under irrigation is usually related to the breakdown of aggregates and dispersion of clay material as a result of rapid wetting. This is particularly so if soils are sodic; that is, having a high exchangeable sodium percentage (ESP) of the cations attached to the clays. High sodium levels (compared to high calcium levels) cause particles to repel one another when wet, and the associated aggregates to disaggregate and disperse. The ESP will increase if irrigation causes salty water (even of low concentration) to gain access to the soil.

A wide range of practices are undertaken to preserve and improve soil structure. For example, the NSW Department of Land and Water Conservation advocates: increasing organic content by incorporating pasture phases into cropping rotations; reducing or eliminating tillage and cultivation in cropping and pasture activities; avoiding soil disturbance during periods of excessive dry or wet when soils may accordingly tend to shatter or smear; and ensuring sufficient ground cover to protect the soil from raindrop impact. In irrigated agriculture, it may be recommended to: apply gypsum (calcium sulfate) to displace sodium cations with calcium and so reduce ESP or sodicity, avoid rapid wetting, and avoid disturbing soils when too wet or dry.

Types
Platy – The units are flat and platelike. They are generally oriented horizontally.

Prismatic – The individual units are bounded by flat to rounded vertical faces. Units are distinctly longer vertically, and the faces are typically casts or molds of adjoining units. Vertices are angular or subrounded; the tops of the prisms are somewhat indistinct and normally flat. Figure 3-17 shows a soil profile with prismatic structure in the subsoil.

Columnar – The units are similar to prisms and bounded by flat or slightly rounded vertical faces. The tops of columns, in contrast to those of prisms, are very distinct and normally rounded.

Blocky – The units are blocklike or polyhedral. They are bounded by flat or slightly rounded surfaces that are casts of the faces of surrounding peds. Typically, blocky structural units are nearly equidimensional but grade to prisms and plates. The structure is described as angular blocky (fig. 3-18) if the faces intersect at relatively sharp angles and as subangular blocky if the faces are a mixture of rounded and plane faces and the corners are mostly rounded.

Granular – The units are approximately spherical or polyhedral. They are bounded by curved or very irregular faces that are not casts of adjoining peds.

Wedge – The units are approximately elliptical with interlocking lenses that terminate in acute angles. They are commonly bounded by small slickensides.

Lenticular —The units are overlapping lenses parallel to the soil surface. They are thickest in the middle and thin towards the edges. Lenticular structure is commonly associated with moist soils, texture classes high in silt or very fine sand (e.g., silt loam), and high potential for frost action.

Improving soil structure
The benefits of improving soil structure for the growth of plants, particularly in an agricultural setting, include: reduced erosion due to greater soil aggregate strength and decreased overland flow; improved root penetration and access to soil moisture and nutrients; improved emergence of seedlings due to reduced crusting of the surface; and greater water infiltration, retention and availability due to improved porosity.

Productivity from irrigated no-tillage or minimum tillage soil management in horticulture usually decreases over time due to degradation of the soil structure, inhibiting root growth and water retention. There are a few exceptions, why such exceptional fields retain structure is unknown, but it is associated with high organic matter. Improving soil structure in such settings can increase yields significantly. The NSW Department of Land and Water Conservation suggests that in cropping systems, wheat yields can be increased by 10 kg/ha for every extra millimetre of rain that is able to infiltrate due to soil structure.

Hardsetting soil
Hardsetting soils lose their structure when wet and then set hard as they dry out to form a structureless mass that is very difficult to cultivate. They can only be tilled when their moisture content is within a limited range. When they are tilled the result is often a very cloddy surface (poor tilth). As they dry out the high soil strength often restricts seedling and root growth. Infiltration rates are low and runoff of rain and irrigation limits the productivity of many hardsetting soils.

Definition

Hardsetting has been defined this way: "A hardsetting soil is one that sets to an almost homogeneous mass on drying. It may have occasional cracks, typically at a spacing of >0.1 m. Air dry hardset soil is hard and brittle, and it is not possible to push a forefinger into the profile face. Typically, it has a tensile strength of 90 kN–2. Soils that crust are not necessarily hardsetting since a hardsetting horizon is thicker than a crust. (In cultivated soils the thickness of the hardsetting horizon is frequently equal to or greater than that of the cultivated layer.) Hardsetting soil is not permanently cemented and is soft when wet. The clods in a hardsetting horizon that has been cultivated will partially or totally disintegrate upon wetting. If the soil has been sufficiently wetted, it will revert to its hardset state on drying. This can happen after flood irrigation or a single intense rainfall event."

Soil structure dynamics 
Soil structure is inherently a dynamic and complex system that is affected by different factors such as tillage, wheel traffic, roots, biological activities in soil, rainfall events, wind erosion, shrinking, swelling, freezing and thawing. In turn, reciprocally soil structure interacts and affects the root growth and function, soil fauna and biota, water and solute transport processes, gas exchange, thermal conductivity and electrical conductivity, traffic bearing capacity, and many other aspects in relation with soil. Ignoring soil structure or viewing it as "static" can lead to poor predictions of soil properties and might significantly affect the soil management.

See also
 Soil health
 Soil resilience

References

Sources 

 Australian Journal of Soil Research, 38(1) 61 – 70. Cited in: Land and Water Australia 2007, ways to improve soil structure and improve the productivity of irrigated agriculture, viewed May 2007, <https://web.archive.org/web/20070930071224/http://npsi.gov.au/>
 Department of Land and Water Conservation 1991, "Field indicators of soil structure decline", viewed May 2007
 Leeper, GW & Uren, NC 1993, 5th edn, Soil science, an introduction, Melbourne University Press, Melbourne
 Marshall, TJ & Holmes JW, 1979, Soil Physics, Cambridge University Press
 
 Charman, PEV & Murphy, BW 1998, 5th edn, Soils, their properties and management, Oxford University Press, Melbourne
 Firuziaan, M. and Estorff, O., (2002), "Simulation of the Dynamic Behavior of Bedding-Foundation-Soil in the Time Domain", Springer Verlag.

External links 
 
 Jordán, Antonio. 2013. What is soil structure?  European Geosciences Union Blog. Accessed 11 June 2017.
 Soil Survey Division Staff. 1993. syu tycid=nrcs142p2_054253 Soil Survey Manual, Chapter 3: Examination and Description of Soils. USDA NRCS. Accessed 11 June 2017.

Soil
Land management